Revillagigedo Channel (locally Revilla) is an ocean channel in the Alexander Archipelago of the U.S. state of Alaska. Extending 56 km (35 mi) northwest from the Dixon Entrance, it lies between the mainland to the east, Revillagigedo Island to the north, and Duke Island and Annette Island to the southwest. It is part of the Inside Passage to Ketchikan.

The channel was named for Juan Vicente de Güemes, 2nd Count of Revillagigedo, viceroy of New Spain, in 1793.

The Tree Point Light is an important aid to navigation in Revillagigedo Channel.

References

External links
Revillagigedo Channel, The Columbia Gazetteer of North America
 

Straits of Alaska
Bodies of water of Ketchikan Gateway Borough, Alaska
Straits of Prince of Wales–Hyder Census Area, Alaska